Shivers may refer to: 
Shivers, an instance of shivering, or the fast contraction and release of muscles
Equine shivers, a neuromuscular disease of horses

Media
Shivers (novel series), a series of children's horror novellas
Shivers (1975 film), a film directed by David Cronenberg
Shivers (1981 film), a  Polish drama film
Shivers (magazine), a British magazine covering the horror genre in movies and literature
Shivers (video game), a 1995 computer game by Sierra On-Line
Shivers (album), a 2005 album by Armin van Buuren
"Shivers" (The Boys Next Door song), a Rowland S. Howard song, popularised by Boys Next Door and Screaming Jets
"Shivers" (Ed Sheeran song), 2021
The Shivers (Austin, Texas), an alt-country band
The Shivers (New York City), a rock, folk and soul duo

See also
Shivers (surname), people with the surname Shivers
Shiver (disambiguation)
Mudbird Shivers, album by Dutch punk/experimental band The Ex
Shivers in Summer, a 1963 comedy film starring Vittorio Gassman
Shivers the Clown, a fictional Serial Killer in the 2004 horror film Fear of Clowns
The Piss Shivers (band), punk rock band in Pennsylvania